M101 OT2015-1 (also known as PSN J14021678+5426205, iPTF13afz and AT 2015dl) is a contact binary that merged into a single star, in a process known as a luminous red nova (LRN). M101 OT2015-1 is an optical transient located in the Pinwheel Galaxy (M101). Luminous red novae are representatives of the sparsely populated class of exploding variables which is known since 1988 when such a star (M31-RV) appeared in the M31 galaxy.

Discovery

M101 OT2015-1 was discovered on February 10, 2015 by Dumitru Ciprian Vîntdevară from Planetarium and Astronomical Observatory of the Museum Vasile Pârvan in Bârlad, România. The transient is located in the outer reaches of a spiral arm of M101, at 489W and 324N of the measured position of the galaxy nucleus.
The transient was discovered with a Newtonian telescope 0,2 m + CCD camera ATIK 320E (on unfiltered) + EQ6 mount.
On February 13, 2015, the New Zealand astronomer Stu Parker, using a telescope located in Spain, confirmed that a new object was visible in the M101 galaxy.  The new object was initially reported as a possible supernova, with the designation PSN J14021678+5426205.  Later it was shown that the new star is not a supernova, and for a while its nature remained uncertain.  One month after the discovery, on March 11, 2015, an Astronomer's Telegram was published where the new star was described as a luminous red nova, confirmed spectroscopically.

The final confirmation came a year later, on 2016 January 28, from observations carried out in several astronomic observatories in Russia.

Observations

Other information 
Although the nature of the object is still debated, its resemblance with other transients from the same LRN family points towards a possible binary origin. The unusual location of the progenitor star in the Hertzsprung gap supports the hypothesis that the most massive component had expanded beyond its roche lobe, initiating the common envelope phase. The outbursts detected for M101-OT2015-1 suggest that this CE was ejected on dynamical timescales, likely leaving a surviving close binary pair.  Further observations at infrared wavelengths will help to show the exact nature of the M101 OT2015-1 system.

References 

Luminous red novae
Ursa Major (constellation)